Owen Michael Beck (born 9 August 2002) is a Welsh professional footballer who plays as a left-back for Liverpool.

Club career
Beck first played for the junior teams of his hometown club, Flint Town United as a striker. At the age of 10 he was awarded with a Flintshire Footballer of the Year award by Ian Rush.  He then joined the youth set-up at Tranmere Rovers before moving to Stoke City, switching to playing in the full-back position.

He then joined Liverpool's Academy from Stoke as an under-13 player. He broke into the under-18 team in the 2019–20 season and was also a part of their Under-19 UEFA Youth League squad.  He moved up to the under-23 squad for the 2020–21 season becoming a playing regular.

In June 2020 he signed his first professional contract with the club, improved his terms in November 2020 and in July 2021 he signed a new long-term contract with the club.

He made two appearances for the first team in the 2021–22 pre-season, playing against friendlies against Athletic Club and CA Osasuna. On 27 October 2021, he made his competitive debut for the first team in an EFL Cup game against Preston North End.

On 11 July 2022 Beck joined Portuguese club Famalicão on loan for the duration of the 2022–23 season. Having made no appearances he was recalled on 31 August and sent on loan to Bolton Wanderers instead. His best friend, Conor Bradley, was also on loan at Bolton. Beck made his league debut for Bolton in November 2022, coming on as a substitute in a 0–0 draw with Cambridge United. The loan was terminated by mutual agreement on 26 January 2023.

International career
He played for Wales as a schoolboy.

In October 2018 he featured in the Wales under-17 team in a match against Kazakhstan, playing 72 minutes of a UEFA European Under-17 Championship qualification match.

In March 2021 he was called up for the Wales under-21 team for a friendly match against the Republic of Ireland but was an unused substitute on matchday.

In August he was again called up and made his debut on 7 September as a 79th minute substitute in a 4–0 victory over Bulgaria in a Euro 2023 qualifying game. He scored his first goal for the Welsh under-21 team on 12 November 2021 with the opening goal in a 7–0 victory over Gibraltar.

Personal life
Beck was born to parents Shaun Beck and Sara James. He has an older brother, Leon and a younger brother, Theo. Beck is the great-nephew of former Liverpool striker Ian Rush, whose sister Carol is Beck's grandmother.

Career statistics

Honours
Liverpool Academy
 Lancashire Senior Cup: 2021-22

References

Living people
2002 births
People from Flint, Flintshire
Sportspeople from Flintshire
Welsh footballers
Association football fullbacks
Wales youth international footballers
Wales under-21 international footballers
Tranmere Rovers F.C. players
Stoke City F.C. players
Liverpool F.C. players
F.C. Famalicão players
Bolton Wanderers F.C. players
Welsh expatriate footballers
Expatriate footballers in Portugal
Welsh expatriate sportspeople in Portugal
English Football League players